The ReVe Festival 2022 – Birthday is the sixth special extended play and  by South Korean girl group Red Velvet. It was released by SM Entertainment on November 28, 2022, and contains five tracks, including the lead single "Birthday". The EP is the second installment of The ReVe Festival 2022, and the fifth overall of The ReVe Festival series.

Background and release
On October 28, 2022, SM Entertainment announced Red Velvet would be releasing a new album in November 2022. On November 7, it was announced the group will be releasing their sixth special extended play titled The ReVe Festival 2022 – Birthday, alongside the lead single "Birthday", on November 28. The EP was described as part of The ReVe Festival 2022 series which starts off with The ReVe Festival 2022 – Feel My Rhythm, released in March 2022, and is continuation of The ReVe Festival trilogy released in 2019. On November 14, the promotional schedule was released. In addition, it was also announced that the EP would contains a total of five tracks. A day later, the mood sampler teaser video was released. On November 27, the music video teaser for "Birthday" was released. The EP was released alongside the music video for "Birthday" on November 28.

Composition
The ReVe Festival 2022 – Birthday consists of five tracks. The lead single "Birthday" was described a pop dance song that samples George Gershwin's composition Rhapsody in Blue, featuring trap, drum, and synth rhythm with lyrics about "returning to the birthday of the person you like and making all of your dreams come true, giving yourself a day to remember". "Bye Bye" was described as a R&B pop dance song with "groovy and dynamic bass and cool string sound". "On a Ride" was described as hyperpop dance song featuring "light beat rhythm characterized by plucked string instrument giving the listener a vibe that makes them feel as if they were in an amusement park". "Zoom" was described as R&B pop dance song featuring "aggressive bass and a dramatic synth rhythm" with lyrics that "describe about a lover thrillingly digging up evidence about their other lying half". "Celebrate" was described as medium tempo R&B ballad song featuring "relax and cozy melody" with "warm aftertaste" lyrics about "the desire to be with the person you love forever, even if you turn back time".

Promotion
Prior to the release of The ReVe Festival 2022 – Birthday, on November 28, 2022, the group held a live event on YouTube and TikTok to introduce the EP and to communicate with their fans.

Track listing

Notes
 "Birthday" samples composition Rhapsody in Blue by George Gershwin.

Charts

Weekly charts

Monthly charts

Year-end chart

Certifications and sales

Release history

See also
 The ReVe Festival: Day 1
 The ReVe Festival: Day 2
 The ReVe Festival: Finale
 The ReVe Festival 2022 – Feel My Rhythm

References

Red Velvet (group) EPs
2022 EPs
SM Entertainment EPs
Korean-language EPs